The Bayrakli Mosque (from , "Mosque of the Standard-bearer") is a historical Ottoman-era mosque in the city of Larissa, Thessaly, Greece.

Description 
The mosque is situated in the centre of the city, at the junction of Papaflessa and Ossis streets. Its masonry of brick-enclosed ashlar dates it to the 15th/16th centuries, contemporary to the bedesten market. Only two walls of the interior hall survive, incorporated in a modern structure.

The mosque reportedly derived its name from the fact that its imam used to hoist a flag (Turkish bayrak) to give the signal for the other mosques to begin the call to prayer for the faithful.

See also 
 Islam in Greece
 List of former mosques in Greece

References 

Buildings and structures in Larissa
Former mosques in Greece
Ottoman mosques in Greece
Ottoman architecture in Thessaly
15th-century mosques
15th-century architecture in Greece